Accidentally on Purpose  is an album by Deep Purple members Ian Gillan and Roger Glover, released in February 1988 on Virgin Records. The track "Lonely Avenue" appeared on the soundtrack to Rain Man featuring Dustin Hoffman and Tom Cruise. The track "Telephone Box" reached No. 15 on the US Billboard Mainstream Rock Tracks chart.

Track listing
All songs by Ian Gillan and Roger Glover, except where indicated
Side 1
 "Clouds and Rain" – 4:03 
 "Evil Eye" – 4:12 
 "She Took My Breath Away" – 4:34 
 "Dislocated" – 3:24 
 "Via Miami" – 5:00

Side 2
 "I Can't Dance to That" – 4:26 
 "Can't Believe You Wanna Leave" (Richard Penniman) – 3:11 
 "Lonely Avenue" (Doc Pomus) – 3:08 
 "Telephone Box" – 5:18 
 "I Thought No" – 3:34

CD edition bonus tracks
 "Cayman Island" – 3:56 
 "The Purple People Eater" (Sheb Wooley) – 2:36 
 "Chet" – 4:17

Personnel
 Ian Gillan – lead vocals, harmonica
 Roger Glover – bass, keyboards, guitars, programming

Additional musicians
Ira Siegel, Nick Maroch – guitars
Lloyd Landesman – keyboards 
Dr. John – piano
Andy Newmark – drums 
George Young, Joe Mennonna – saxophones
Randy Brecker – flugelhorn
Vaneese Thomas, Christine Faith, Lydia Mann, Bette Sussmann – Background vocals

Production
Nick Blagona – engineer
Frank Oglethorpe, Carl Lever, Ken Blair – assistant engineers (AIR Studios)
Bruce Robbins – assistant engineer (Minot Studio)
Dave O'Donnell – assistant engineer (Power Station)
Peter Hodgson – assistant engineer (Sountec Studio)
Greg Calbi – mastering at Sterling Sound, New York

Singles/EP
 "Dislocated" / "Chet" (UK, Dec 1987)
 "Dislocated" [EP] (UK, Dec 1987)
 "I Can't Dance to That" / "Purple People Eater" (UK, Feb 1988)
 "Clouds And Rain" / "I Thought No" (UK, Feb 1988)
 "She Took My Breath Away" / "Cayman Island" (UK, Feb 1988)
 "She Took My Breath Away" [EP] (UK, Feb 1988)

Chart performance

References

1988 debut albums
Albums produced by Roger Glover
Ian Gillan albums
Roger Glover albums
Virgin Records albums
Albums recorded at AIR Studios
Collaborative albums